The flag of Ngazidja was adopted in 2002. It is a navy blue field with a white crescent moon and four white stars in the hoist side.

Historical Flags
Throughout history, only one other flag has been used on the island, it was the sultan's personal flag used from the unification of the island to the French annexation. According to Lucien Philippe, the standard of the Sultan was a crimson square flag with a golden fringe and seven stars representing the seven Sultanates unified into one. The pattern of the stars shall recall the map of the island.

Notes

External links

Flag
Comorian culture
Flags of Africa
Flags introduced in 2002